Don Sherwood may refer to:
Don Sherwood (politician) (born 1941), American politician
Don Sherwood (DJ) (1925–1983), American radio personality
Don Sherwood (cartoonist) (1930–2010), American cartoonist and illustrator